is a 1991 Japanese film directed by Tomio Kuriyama. It was released on 23 December 1991. It is the fourth film in the Tsuribaka Nisshi series.

Awards
15th Japan Academy Prize
Won: Best Actor - Rentarō Mikuni
Nominated: Best Music - Masaru Sato

References

1991 films
Films directed by Tomio Kuriyama
1990s Japanese-language films
4
Shochiku films
Films scored by Masaru Sato
Films set in Wakayama Prefecture
1990s Japanese films